Graha Bethany Nginden (also called Bethany Church of God in English) is an evangelical megachurch affiliated with Gereja Bethany Indonesia in Surabaya, Indonesia. The senior pastor of this community is Aswin Tanuseputra since 2012, replacing his father Abraham Alex Tanuseputra. In 2020, the attendance is 140,000 people.

History 
The church was founded in 1977 by Pastor Abraham Alex Tanuseputra. It included his family and 7 people. By 1987, the Church had 2,000 members. It was a member of the Gereja Bethel Indonesia (Church of God (Cleveland, Tennessee)) until 2003, when the regional section Gereja Bethany Indonesia became independent. In 2000, the church inaugurated a 20,000-seat temple that will reach 35,000 places after renovations, in 2009.

On 12 May 2019, Ps. Aswin has announced that Graha Bethany Nginden with its branches in Surabaya are affiliated with Erastus Sabdono's Gereja Suara Kebenaran Injil (GSKI). In 2020, the Church had 140,000 people.

Humanitarian implication
Graha Bethany Nginden founded Bethany Care, a health center  open to everyone that assists the needy and works frequently with the Red Cross.

Educational institutions
GSKI Bethany Nginden has a KB-TK-SD school under the name Bethany Christian School (BCS), which was founded in 2017.

See also

List of the largest evangelical churches
List of the largest evangelical church auditoriums
Worship service (evangelicalism)

References

External links
 gerejabethany.org

Evangelical megachurches in Indonesia
Christian organizations established in 1977
Churches in Java